Stigmella naturnella is a moth of the family Nepticulidae. It is found in the Czech Republic, Slovakia, Austria, Hungary, Italy and central and eastern Russia.

There are two generations per year.

The larvae feed on Betula species. They mine the leaves of their host plant. The mine consists of a long, slender corridor with a narrow central frass line. Pupation takes place outside of the mine.

External links
Fauna Europaea
bladmineerders.nl
Nepticulidae from the Volga and Ural region

Nepticulidae
Moths of Europe
Moths of Asia
Moths described in 1936